Joel Meyerowitz (born March 6, 1938) is an American street, portrait and landscape photographer. He began photographing in color in 1962 and was an early advocate of the use of color during a time when there was significant resistance to the idea of color photography as serious art. In the early 1970s he taught photography at the Cooper Union in New York City.

His work is in the collections of the International Center of Photography, Museum of Modern Art, and New York Public Library, all in New York, and the Museum of Contemporary Photography in Chicago.

Career
In 1962, inspired by seeing Robert Frank at work, Meyerowitz quit his job as an art director at an advertising agency and took to the streets of New York City with a 35 mm camera and color film. As well as Frank, Meyerowitz was inspired by Henri Cartier-Bresson and Eugène Atget—he has said "In the pantheon of greats there is Robert Frank and there is Atget."

After alternating between black and white and color, Meyerowitz "permanently adopted color" in 1972, well before John Szarkowski's promotion in 1976 of color photography in an exhibition of work by the then little-known William Eggleston. Meyerowitz also switched at this time to large format, often using an 8×10 camera to produce photographs of places and people.

Meyerowitz appears extensively in the 2006 BBC Four documentary series The Genius of Photography and in the 2013 documentary film Finding Vivian Maier. In 2014 the documentary Sense of Time by German filmmaker Ralph Goertz was published.

He is the author of 26 books including Cape Light, considered a classic work of color photography. Meyerowitz photographed the aftermath of the September 11, 2001 attack on the World Trade Center, and was the only photographer allowed unrestricted access to its Ground Zero immediately following the attack. This resulted in the book Aftermath: World Trade Center Archive (2006), which Parr and Badger include in the third volume of their photobook history.

On January 18, 2017 Meyerowitz was honored for his lifelong work with a place at the Leica Hall of Fame and was described as a "magician using colour" and being able to "both capture and framing the decisive moment".

Personal life
Meyerowitz was born in the Bronx, to working class Jewish immigrant parents from Hungary and Russia. He studied art, art history, and medical illustration at Ohio State University, graduating in 1959. He is married to English novelist Maggie Barrett. In addition to their home in New York City, they maintain a residence outside of Siena, Tuscany, Italy.

Publications

Publications by Meyerowitz
 Cape Light: Color Photographs by Joel Meyerowitz.
Boston: Museum of Fine Arts, Boston, 1979. , .
New York: Aperture, 2015. . With a transcript of an interview between Meyerowitz and Bruce K. MacDonald. "Remastered".
 St. Louis and the Arch. New York: New York Graphic Society, 1980. .
 Wild Flowers. Boston: Bulfinch, 1983. .
Revised edition. Damiani, 2021. .
 A Summer's Day. New York: Crown, 1985. .
 Creating a Sense of Place. Washington, DC: Smithsonian Institution Press, 1990. .
 Redheads. New York, NY: Rizzoli, 1991. .
 Bay/Sky. Boston: Bulfinch, 1993. .
 At the Water's Edge. Boston: Bulfinch, 1996. .
 Joel Meyerowitz. Text by Colin Westerbeck. 55. London: Phaidon, 2001. .
 Tuscany: Inside the Light. New York: Barnes & Noble, 2003. .
 Aftermath
 Aftermath. London: Phaidon, 2006. .
 Aftermath: World Trade Center Archive. London: Phaidon, 2011. .
 Out of the Ordinary 1970-1980. Rotterdam: Episode, 2007. .
 Legacy: The Preservation of Wilderness in New York City Parks. New York: Aperture, 2009. .
 Between the Dog and the Wolf. Kamakura, Japan: Super Labo, 2013. . Edition of 500 copies.
 Joel Meyerowitz - Retrospective. Cologne / New York: Koenig Books / D.A.P., 2014. .
 Glimpse. Tokyo: Super Labo, 2014. . Edition of 1000 copies.
Out of the Darkness: Six months in Andalusia 1966~1967. Madrid: La Fábrica, 2018. .
Where I Find Myself: A Lifetime Retrospective. London: Laurence King, 2018. . With a text by Colin Westerbeck.
Joel Meyerowitz: How I Make Photographs. Masters of Photography. London: Laurence King, 2020. .

Publications with contributions by Meyerowitz
American Independents: Eighteen Color Photographers. New York: Abbeville, 1987. . Includes work by Larry Babis, Jim Dow, William Eggleston, Mitch Epstein, David T. Hanson, John Harding, Len Jenshel, Nancy Lloyd, Kenneth McGowan, Roger Mertin, Joel Meyerowitz, Richard Misrach, Joanne Mulberg, Stephen Scheer, Stephen Shore, Joel Sternfeld, Jack D. Teemer, Jr., and Daniel S. Williams. Edited by Sally Eauclaire.
 Bystander: A History of Street Photography. With Colin Westerbeck.
Bystander: A History of Street Photography. Boston: Bulfinch, 1994. . Hardback.
Bystander: a History of Street Photography: with a new afterword on street photography since the 1970s. Boston: Bulfinch, 2001. 440 pages. . Revised and expanded edition. Paperback.
Bystander: A History of Street Photography. London: Laurence King, 2017. . Revised and expanded edition. Hardback.
Street Photography Now. London: Thames & Hudson, 2010.  (hardback). London: Thames & Hudson, 2011.  (paperback). Edited by Sophie Howarth and Stephen McLaren.

Awards
Guggenheim Fellow (twice)
National Endowment for the Arts award
National Endowment for the Humanities award
Deutscher Fotobuchpreis (the German photobook prize) for Aftermath
The Royal Photographic Society's Centenary Medal and Honorary Fellowship (HonFRPS) in recognition of a sustained, significant contribution to the art of photography in 2012.

Exhibitions
1968: My European Trip: Photographs from the Car by Joel Meyerowitz, MOMA, August 3–September 29, 1968
2006: Joel Meyerowitz: Modern Color, Vintage Prints, Edwynn Houk Gallery, April 27 — June 17, 2006
2012: Joel Meyerowitz - 50 Years of Photographs Part I: 1962 - 1977, November–December 2012; and Joel Meyerowitz - 50 Years of Photographs Part II: 1976 - 2012, December 2012 – January 2013, Howard Greenberg Gallery, New York.
2014: Joel Meyerowitz Retrospective, NRW-Forum Düsseldorf, curated by Ralph Goertz,
2015: Joel Meyerowitz - Retrospective, KunstHausWien, curated by Verena Kaspar-Eisert
2017: Joel Meyerowitz - Transition, Howard Greenberg Gallery, September 7 - October 21, 2017

Collections
Art Institute of Chicago, Chicago, IL
International Center of Photography, New York
Museum of Contemporary Photography, Chicago
Museum of Modern Art, New York – Photography Collection
New York Public Library, New York – Photography Collection
Amon Carter Museum, Fort Worth, Texas - Photography Collection

References

External links
 

American portrait photographers
Photographers from the Bronx
1938 births
Living people
Ohio State University alumni
People from Provincetown, Massachusetts
Street photographers
Landscape photographers
20th-century American photographers
20th-century American male artists
21st-century American photographers
21st-century American male artists